This is a list of serving Air Marshals of the Indian Air Force.

Chief of the Air Staff 
The Chief of the Air Staff is the only serving Four Star Air Officer in the Indian Air Force.

Vice Chief of the Air Staff 
The Vice Chief of the Air Staff is the second-highest ranking officer in the Indian Air Force.

Air Commanders (Commander-in-Chief grade) 

*Rotational Command.

Principal Staff Officers at Air Headquarters

Heads of Services and Directorates

Air Officers of Tri-Services Commands

Senior Staff Officers of Air Commands

Commandants of Training Institutions

See also
 List of serving generals of the Indian Army
 List of serving admirals of the Indian Navy

References

External links 

Lists of Indian military personnel
Indian Air Force air marshals
Indian Air Force appointments
Indian military appointments
Indian Air Force